Hydrochlorothiazide is a diuretic medication often used to treat high blood pressure and swelling due to fluid build-up. Other uses include treating diabetes insipidus and renal tubular acidosis and to decrease the risk of kidney stones in those with a high calcium level in the urine. Hydrochlorothiazide shows greater effect on systolic blood pressure than diastolic one which can reach 4 mmHg to 6 mmHg pressure reduction. Hydrochlorothiazide is less effective than chlortalidone for prevention of heart attack or stroke. Hydrochlorothiazide is taken by mouth and may be combined with other blood pressure medications as a single pill to increase effectiveness.

Potential side effects include poor kidney function; electrolyte imbalances, including low blood potassium, and, less commonly, low blood sodium, gout, high blood sugar, and feeling lightheaded with standing. While allergies to hydrochlorothiazide are reported to occur more often in those with allergies to sulfa drugs, this association is not well supported. It may be used during pregnancy, but it is not a first-line medication in this group.

It is in the thiazide medication class and acts by decreasing the kidneys' ability to retain water. This initially reduces blood volume, decreasing blood return to the heart and thus cardiac output. It is believed to lower peripheral vascular resistance in the long run.

Two companies, Merck and Ciba, state they discovered the medication which became commercially available in 1959. It is on the World Health Organization's List of Essential Medicines. It is available as a generic drug and is relatively affordable. In 2020, it was the eleventh most commonly prescribed medication in the United States, with more than 41million prescriptions.

Medical uses
Hydrochlorothiazide is used for the treatment of hypertension, congestive heart failure, symptomatic edema, diabetes insipidus, renal tubular acidosis. It is also used for the prevention of kidney stones in those who have high levels of calcium in their urine.

Multiple studies suggest hydrochlorothiazide could be used as initial monotherapy in people with primary hypertension; however, the decision should be weighed against the consequence of long-term adverse metabolic abnormalities. A review of randomised trials showed varying efficacy in cardiovascular outcomes on age, ethnicity and existing cardiovascular risks. A systematic, multinational, large-scale analysis by Suchard et al. supported equivalence between drug classes for initiating monotherapy in hypertension, however thiazide or thiazide-like diuretics showed better primary effectiveness and safety profiles than angiotensin-converting enzyme inhibitors and non-dihydropyridine calcium channel blockers.

Hydrochlorothiazide is less potent but not necessarily less effective than chlorthalidone in reducing blood pressure.  More robust studies are required to confirm which drug is superior in reducing cardiovascular events. Side effect profile for both drugs appear similar and are dose dependant.

Hydrochlorothiazide is also sometimes used to prevent osteopenia and for treatment of hypoparathyroidism, hypercalciuria, Dent's disease, and Ménière's disease. For diabetes insipidus, the effect of thiazide diuretics is presumably mediated by a hypovolemia-induced increase in proximal sodium and water reabsorption, thereby diminishing water delivery to the ADH-sensitive sites in the collecting tubules and increasing the urine osmolality.

A low level of evidence, predominantly from observational studies, suggests that thiazide diuretics have a modest beneficial effect on bone mineral density and are associated with a decreased fracture risk when compared with people not taking thiazides. Thiazides decrease mineral bone loss by promoting calcium retention in the kidney, and by directly stimulating osteoblast differentiation and bone mineral formation.

The combination of fixed-dose preparation such as losartan/hydrochlorothiazide has added advantages of a more potent antihypertensive effect with additional antihypertensive efficacy at the dose of 100 mg/25 mg when compared to monotherapy.

Adverse effects
 Hypokalemia, or low blood levels of potassium are an occasional side effect. It can be usually prevented by potassium supplements or by combining hydrochlorothiazide with a potassium-sparing diuretic
 Other disturbances in the levels of serum electrolytes, including hypomagnesemia (low magnesium), hyponatremia (low sodium), and hypercalcemia (high calcium)
 Hyperuricemia (high levels of uric acid in the blood). All thiazide diuretics including hydrochlorothiazide can inhibit excretion of uric acid by the kidneys, thereby increasing serum concentrations of uric acid. This may increase the incidence of gout in doses of ≥ 25 mg per day and in more susceptible patients such as male gender of <60 years old.
 Hyperglycemia, high blood sugar
 Hyperlipidemia, high cholesterol and triglycerides
 Headache
 Nausea/vomiting
 Photosensitivity
 Weight gain
 Pancreatitis

Package inserts contain vague and inconsistent data surrounding the use of thiazide diuretics in patients with allergies to sulfa drugs, with little evidence to support these statements. A retrospective cohort study conducted by Strom et al. concluded that there is an increased risk of an allergic reaction occurring in patients with a predisposition to allergic reactions in general rather than cross reactivity from structural components of the sulfonamide-based drug. Prescribers should examine the evidence carefully and assess each patient individually, paying particular attention to their prior history of sulfonamide hypersensitivity rather than relying on drug monograph information.

There is an increased risk of non-melanoma skin cancer. In August 2020, the Australian Therapeutic Goods Administration required the Product Information (PI) and Consumer Medicine Information (CMI) for medicines containing hydrochlorothiazide to be updated to include details about an increased risk of non-melanoma skin cancer. In August 2020, the U.S. Food and Drug Administration (FDA) updated the drug label about an increased risk of non-melanoma skin cancer (basal cell skin cancer or squamous cell skin cancer).

Mechanism of action
Hydrochlorothiazide belongs to the thiazide class of diuretics. It reduces blood volume by acting on the kidneys to reduce sodium (Na+) reabsorption in the distal convoluted tubule. The major site of action in the nephron appears on an electroneutral NaCl co-transporter by competing for the chloride site on the transporter. By impairing Na+ transport in the distal convoluted tubule, hydrochlorothiazide induces a natriuresis and concomitant water loss. Thiazides increase the reabsorption of calcium in this segment in a manner unrelated to sodium transport. Additionally, by other mechanisms, hydrochlorothiazide is believed to lower peripheral vascular resistance.

Dosage
Hydrochlorothiazide has blood pressure lowering effect which depend on the dose. In a double-blind, randomized study, the effects of 25 mg/day vs. 50 mg/day of hydrochlorothiazide were evaluated in geriatric patients (n = 51) with isolated systolic hypertension. Both dosages were associated with similar reductions in blood pressure; however, the higher dose (50 mg/day) caused a greater decline in serum potassium concentration.

Society and culture

Brand names
Hydrochlorothiazide is available as a generic drug under a large number of brand names, including Apo-Hydro, Aquazide, BPZide, Dichlotride, Esidrex, Hydrochlorot, Hydrodiuril, HydroSaluric, Hypothiazid, Microzide, Oretic and many others.

To reduce pill burden and in order to reduce side effects, hydrochlorothiazide is often used in fixed-dose combinations with many other classes of antihypertensive drugs such as:
 ACE inhibitors — e.g. Prinzide or Zestoretic (with lisinopril), Co-Renitec (with enalapril), Capozide (with captopril), Accuretic (with quinapril), Monopril HCT (with fosinopril), Lotensin HCT (with benazepril), etc.
 Angiotensin receptor blockers — e.g. Hyzaar (with losartan), Co-Diovan or Diovan HCT (with valsartan), Teveten Plus (with eprosartan), Avalide or CoAprovel (with irbesartan), Atacand HCT or Atacand Plus (with candesartan), etc.
 Beta blockers — e.g. Ziac or Lodoz (with bisoprolol), Nebilet Plus or Nebilet HCT (with nebivolol), Dutoprol or Lopressor HCT (with metoprolol), etc.
 Direct renin inhibitors — e.g. Co-Rasilez or Tekturna HCT (with aliskiren)
 Potassium sparing diuretics: Dyazide and Maxzide triamterene

Sport
Use of hydrochlorothiazide is prohibited by the World Anti-Doping Agency for its ability to mask the use of performance-enhancing drugs.

References

External links 
 

AMPA receptor positive allosteric modulators
Antihypertensive agents
Benzothiadiazines
Merck brands
Carbonic anhydrase inhibitors
Diuretics
IARC Group 2B carcinogens
Sulfonamides
Thiazides
World Anti-Doping Agency prohibited substances
World Health Organization essential medicines
Wikipedia medicine articles ready to translate
Sultams